Bostan Rural District is a rural district (dehestan) in Bostan District, Dasht-e Azadegan County, Khuzestan Province, Iran. At the 2006 census, its population was 1,859, in 267 families.  The rural district has 10 villages.

References 

Rural Districts of Khuzestan Province
Dasht-e Azadegan County